Kinnya or Kinya is a village in Dakshina Kannada district of Karnataka state, India. The ancient Kinya Jumma Masjid (Hazrath Hussan Musliyar Dargah Shareef) And Talapady Durga Parameshwari Temple is in this village. The village Kinnya lies near Arabian Sea Shared Border with Thalapady, Kotekar And Manjanady  Village. Total Population 6800, Native Language Beary, Malayalam And Tulu. It is located 23 km south of Mangalore city. In local Tulu language Kinya means small. The Durga Parameshwari Temple was recently renovated in the year 2015. Shree Durga Parameshwari temple is the family deity (Kuladevi) of many people who are the natives of undivided South Canara (South Kanara) District ( now, Dakshina Kannada, Udupi and Kasargod ). The village code is 02699400 as per Karnataka Administrative atlas 2001 published by DCO of Karnataka state.  Pincode of Kinya village post office is 575023.

References

Karnataka Administrative Atlas 2001 published by DCO Karnataka( PRG-337 Kar/350-2006 )

Villages in Dakshina Kannada district